Lucantonio Giunti or Giunta (1457 – 3 April 1538) was a Florentine book publisher and printer, active in Venice from 1489, a member of the Giunti family of printers. His publishing business was successful, and among the most important in the late fifteenth and early sixteenth centuries. Through partnerships, often with members of his family, he expanded the business through much of Europe. At about the time of his death in 1538 there were Giunti presses in Florence and Lyon, Giunti bookshops or warehouses in Antwerp, Burgos, Frankfurt, Lisbon, Medina del Campo, Paris, Salamanca and Zaragoza, and agencies in numerous cities of the Italian peninsula, including Bologna, Brescia, Genoa, Livorno, Lucca, Naples, Piacenza, Pisa, Rome, Siena and Turin, as well as the islands of Sardinia and Sicily.

Life 
Lucantonio Giunti was one of the seven sons of Giunta di Biagio, a weaver. With his brother Bernardo, he left Florence in about 1477 for Venice, where he set up as a stationer. In 1489 he started book publishing with three titles: the works of Ovid; an anonymous translation into the volgare of the Transito de sancto Hieronymo, partly by Eusebius Cremonensis; and a translation of the Imitatio Christi, authorship of which he attributed to Jean Gerson. For all three he employed the printer and typographer Matteo Capcasa. From 1491 Giunti was constantly active as a publisher, and later as a printer too; he issued some 410 titles during his lifetime. He did not have his own printing workshop until about 1500; until that time, he employed independent typographers, most frequently Johan Emerich of Speier.

References 

Italian printers
Italian publishers (people)
Printers of incunabula
15th-century Italian businesspeople
16th-century Italian businesspeople
1457 births
1538 deaths
15th-century Venetian people
16th-century Venetian people